Peter Nedergaard (born 31 October 1957) is a Danish professor of political science who has been employed at the Department of Political Science at the University of Copenhagen since 2008. Peter Nedergaard is member of the Order of Dannebrog.

Bevillinger

Education and career 
In 1985 Peter Nedergaard obtained the title of Master of Science in Political Science. He later earned a PhD from the Institut for Statskundskab, Århus, Denmark and an Exam.Art. in Philosophy. In 1983-84, Peter Nedergaard was a Robert Schuman research fellow in the research department of the European Parliament in Luxembourg and a stagiaire in the cabinet of agricultural commissioner, Poul Dalsager, in Brussels.

Peter Nedergaard has previously been affiliated with the Copenhagen Business School as associate professor, assistant professor and finally as professor with special responsibilities. For a number of years he left the academic world, instead working as head of unit in the Danish Consumer Council and the Danish Ministry of Employment respectively. Peter Nedergaard's research covers European policy and European integration with special attention to business policy, internal market policy, climate policy, agricultural policy and employment policy. In 2007, he was a visiting scholar at Stanford University.

Research and publications 
Peter Nedergaard's research has been published in international scientific journals such as the Journal of Common Market Studies, Journal of European Public Policy, Public Choice, Journal of European Integration, Scandinavian Political Studies, Cooperation and Conflict and Policy Studies. In addition, he has published a number of textbooks for high schools and universities on inter alia theory of science, European policy and the economics and politics of China, the USA, Germany and the EU.
 
Alongside his work as a researcher, Peter Nedergaard has been a member of several boards, councils and commissions, including the Mortgage Credit Complaint Board, the Complaint Board of Banking Services, the Suffrage Commission and the committee on liability of financial advisers. In 1992-2009 he was the executive editor of the Danish scientific journal Økonomi & Politik.

Peter Nedergaard is a reviewer for several international research foundations and journals. He is also a prolific columnist and often appears in the media as a political expert and commentator. In 2018, he was ranked as the second-most cited scientist at the University of Copenhagen by Uniavisen.

Peter Nedergaard is initiator to the so-called Erik Rasmussen Prize, which is given to a researcher in Political Science by the Danish Society of Political Science. The Prize is the highest prize within Political Science in Denmark, and it is named after the “founding father” of Political Science in Denmark, Professor Erik Rasmussen, who established the Department of Political Science at University of Aarhus in the beginning of the 1960s.

Peter Nedergaard is also the initiator to the publication of the "Routledge Handbook of the Politics of Brexit", published in 2018 with Professor Ben Rosamond and Associate Professor Patrick Diamond as co-editors. In addition, Peter Nedergaard is the initiator of the preparation of the Oxford Handbook of Danish Politics, published at Oxford University Press in 2020, which is the most comprehensive international work on Danish politics so far. Professor Peter Munk Christiansen and Professor Jørgen Elklit are co-editors on this publication.

Selected bibliography 
Books
 
 
 
 
 
 
 
 
 

Book chapters
 
 
 
 
 
 
 
 
 
 
 
 
 
 
 
 

Journal articles
 
 
 
  
  Pdf.
  Pdf.
 
 
 
 
  Pdf.

References

External links 
 Homepage of Peter Nedergaard at University of Copenhagen
 Homepage of Peter Nedergaard at Wordpress

1957 births
Academic staff of the University of Copenhagen
Living people
Academic staff of Copenhagen Business School
Danish political scientists